Michael A. Banks (born November 5, 1979) is a former American football tight end for the Arizona Cardinals of the National Football League. He was drafted in the seventh round of the 2002 NFL Draft.

References

External links
ESPN.com bio

1979 births
Living people
Iowa State Cyclones football players
Arizona Cardinals players
People from Mason City, Iowa
American football tight ends